Hermentaria (minor planet designation: 346 Hermentaria) is a very large main-belt asteroid. It was discovered by French astronomer Auguste Charlois on 25 November 1892, in Nice. It is probably named for the town of Herment in the region of Auvergne, France. The orbital plane is inclined by 8.7° to the plane of the ecliptic.

This body has a rotation period of  during which it varies in brightness with an amplitude of  magnitude. The near infrared spectra of this object show absorption features that suggest a mix of the minerals clinopyroxene and orthopyroxene. It may be thermally–evolved, having at least partially melted at some point. The overall shape resembles a prolate spheroid.

References

External links 
 
 

000346
000346
000346
Discoveries by Auguste Charlois
Named minor planets
18921125